Chanice Chase-Taylor (born August 6, 1993 in Toronto, Ontario) is a Canadian track and field athlete competing in the hurdles.

In July 2016, she was officially named to Canada's Olympic team in the 400 metre hurdles and 4x400 meters relay events.

Chase-Taylor is Majoring in sport administration with a concentration in sport leadership at Louisiana State University.

References

1993 births
Living people
Athletes from Toronto
Canadian female hurdlers
Athletes (track and field) at the 2016 Summer Olympics
Olympic track and field athletes of Canada
Black Canadian female track and field athletes